Mark Williams (born 22 August 1959) is an English actor, comedian, presenter and screenwriter. He first achieved widespread recognition as one of the central performers in the popular BBC sketch show The Fast Show. His film roles include Horace in the 1996 adaptation of 101 Dalmatians and Arthur Weasley in seven of the Harry Potter films. He made recurring appearances as Brian Williams in the BBC television series Doctor Who and as Olaf Petersen in Red Dwarf. Since 2013, Williams has portrayed the title character in the long-running BBC series loosely based on the Father Brown short stories by G. K. Chesterton.

Early life
Williams was born on 22 August 1959 in Bromsgrove, Worcestershire. Educated at North Bromsgrove High School and then Brasenose College, Oxford, where he performed with the Oxford University Dramatic Society, he made a career as a theatre actor with the Royal Shakespeare Company and the Royal National Theatre. He came to wider public attention through his appearances on the BBC television programmes, Alexei Sayle's Stuff and The Fast Show. Williams has described the huge popularity of the latter show as a "double-edged sword", as it has led to his being seen by the public as a comedian rather than as an actor.

Career
Williams made his film début alongside fellow débutants Hugh Grant and Imogen Stubbs in the Oxford University Film Foundation production Privileged in 1982.

His most famous cinema role is as Arthur Weasley in the Harry Potter film series, which began in 2002. Other high-profile appearances include the film adaptation of Neil Gaiman's Stardust alongside Michelle Pfeiffer, Robert De Niro and Claire Danes in 2007 and a 2012 role in Doctor Who as Brian Williams, father of the Doctor's companion, Rory.

Since 2013, he has appeared as the lead role in the BBC costume drama Father Brown. Williams also featured in the first series of Blandings, the BBC TV adaptation of the P. G. Wodehouse Blandings Castle stories, broadcast in 2013, in which he played Beach, the Emsworths' tipsy butler; he did not return for the show's second series, for which he was replaced by Tim Vine.

In 2014 and 2015, he presented the BBC daytime game show The Link. The show ran for two series. His other film roles include 101 Dalmatians and The Borrowers, both with Hugh Laurie.

Aside from his acting work, Williams has also presented several documentary programmes exploring his passion for industrial history: Mark Williams' Big Bangs on the history of explosives, a follow-up to previous series Mark Williams on the Rails, Industrial Revelations and More Industrial Revelations.

Interviewed in 2014 by the Lancashire Evening Post, when asked if some people still saw him as a comedy actor, Williams replied, "Well, it's only a few people in the BBC. In America, they see me as a major British character actor, but unfortunately, the BBC is pretty parochial and people are institutionalised here."

Personal life
Williams was married,  and has a daughter from a previous relationship, born in 2002.

In a 2005 interview Williams said he was a supporter of Aston Villa F.C.

Despite playing Father Brown on television, Williams does not consider himself to be a religious man. In an interview with MuggleNet, he revealed: "I was brought up in the Church of England, so that’s part of my culture. But I don’t practice my religion. Father Brown believes in redemption, and he believes that we're all God's children, and he's a man of faith, so I respect him.”

Filmography

Film

Television

Video games

Theme park rides

Voice-over
 Power Rangers Operation Overdrive - Big Mouth Monster (episode "Both Sides Now")
 Merlin - The Goblin (episode "Goblin's Gold")
 Power Rangers Samurai - Eyescar (episode "The Rescue")
 Lego Dimensions - Arthur Weasley 
 We're Going on a Bear Hunt - Dad
 Early Man - Barry

References

External links

1959 births
Living people
20th-century English male actors
21st-century English male actors
Alumni of Brasenose College, Oxford
British male television writers
English male film actors
English male stage actors
English male television actors
English male video game actors
English male voice actors
English television writers
Male actors from Worcestershire
Outstanding Performance by a Cast in a Motion Picture Screen Actors Guild Award winners
People from Bromsgrove
The Fast Show